Stephanie Dowrick (born 2 June 1947) is an Australian writer, Interfaith Minister and social activist. She is the author of more than 20 books of fiction and non-fiction, five of them best-sellers. She was a publisher in Australia and the UK, where she co-founded The Women's Press, London.

Background
Stephanie Dowrick was born in Wellington, New Zealand, on 2 June 1947. Her mother, Estelle Mary Dowrick (née Brisco, daughter of 7th baronet Sir Hylton Musgrave Campbell Brisco), died in 1955.

As a child, Dowrick went to a number of primary schools, then to Sacred Heart College in Lower Hutt for her secondary education, leaving school at the age of 16. Dowrick left New Zealand in 1967, lived for some months in Israel, then lived in Europe from 1967–1983, mainly in London, but also from 1970–71 in West Berlin. She became a Roman Catholic at the age of nine after the death of her mother and her father's remarriage. As an adult she was for many years a member of the Religious Society of Friends (Quakers).

Since 1983, she has lived in Sydney with her family.

Dowrick was an Adjunct Fellow with the Writing and Society Research Group at Western Sydney University, where she graduated with a PhD degree in 2008. She was ordained by the New Seminary, New York, where she graduated in 2005.

Career

Publishing and The Women's Press

Dowrick was an editor and publisher at George G. Harrap and Co., London, the New English Library, and Triad Paperbacks.

In 1977, Dowrick co-founded the independent feminist publishing house, The Women's Press, from her home in East London, which was financially backed by entrepreneur Naim Attallah.

The Women's Press was "a political press" explicitly linked with the Women's Movement. Along with Virago publishers, founded by Australian Carmen Callil, The Women's Press was the largest feminist publisher in the English language during the key period of the second wave of the women's liberation movement, largely considered to have run from 1969 to the mid-1980s.

Among the first books published by The Women's Press in 1978 were titles by Alice Munro (Lives of Girls and Women), Sylvia Townsend Warner (Lolly Willowes: or, The loving huntsman), and Michèle Roberts (A Piece of the Night).

The Women's Press published other influential 20th-century feminist writers, including Alice Walker, whose Pulitzer Prize-winning The Color Purple "transformed African-American literature", Janet Frame,
 Andrea Dworkin, Lucy Goodison, Joanna Ryan, May Sarton, Susan Griffin and Lisa Alther.

Dowrick was Chair of The Women's Press Board of Directors from 1989 to 1997. She was later Chairperson of The Women's Press, before its amalgamation with Quartet Books.

Dowrick was the first winner of Women in Publishing's Pandora Award in 1981.

Dowrick worked for Allen & Unwin, Sydney, from 1989 to 1992, as their founding part-time Fiction Publisher.

Psychotherapy

Dowrick had a small private psychotherapy practice for many years.

Writing

From 1983, writing became Dowrick's primary work. Her books includes fiction and non-fiction for children and adults.

Dowrick's first novel, Running Backwards Over Sand (1985), was autobiographical in part with the book's protagonist Zoe Delightey's mother dying at an early age.

In a review of Choosing Happiness (2006), The Age newspaper wrote: "Dowrick's gift is to bring the sacred into the mundane." Everyday Kindness (2011) was described in The Sydney Morning Herald as "the practical expression of her spiritual ethic."

Dowrick's more explicitly spiritual books include Seeking the Sacred (2010), and In the Company of Rilke, a scholarly spiritual study of the work of the European poet, Rainer Maria Rilke.

Spirituality
Dowrick has been described as a "pioneering individual" in interfaith, post-denominational spirituality. Her spiritual journey has included Buddhism, Judaism and Christianity, and her influences include Ven Thich Nhat Hanh, Dom Bede Griffiths, Thomas Merton, and Irish poet John O'Donohue.

In June 2005, Dowrick became one of Australia's first Interfaith Ministers. She trained at the New Seminary, New York, an interfaith seminary founded in 1979 by Rabbi Joseph Gelberman.

Since 2006, Dowrick has led an interfaith spiritually inclusive congregation in Sydney, Australia. Since 2000, she has led retreats in New Zealand.

Media
Dowrick has contributed to Australia's literary and media culture over many years.

She is a literary journalist and columnist for Fairfax Media on issues of ethics and social justice, feminism, spirituality, and refugees in Australia.

She has appeared as a regular guest on ABC Radio on a range of programmes including Life Matters, The Spirit of Things, All in the Mind, and Tony Delroy's NightLife. From 1995 to 2004, she was "On the Couch" presenter on ABC Radio National's Life Matters. From 2001 to 2010, she was the "Inner Life" columnist for Good Weekend Magazine (The Sydney Morning Herald and The Age).

She was an ambassador and well-being presenter for Breast Cancer Network Australia (BCNA).

She is an ambassador for the International Women's Development Agency (IWDA).

Awards
 Pandora Award, Women in Publishing, 1981 
 Nautilus Silver Award, Choosing Happiness (Psychology/Personal Growth), 2009
  COVR (Coalition of Visionary Resources) Award (Best in print – General Interest/How to winner), Creative Journal Writing, 2010
 Nautilus Grand/Gold Award, Heaven on Earth (Religion/Spirituality category)

Works

Nonfiction
 Land of Zeus, Doubleday, New York; New English Library, London (1974)
 Why Children? co-edited with Grundberg, Sibyl. Harcourt Brace, Jovanovich, New York; The Women's Press, London (1980)
 After the Gulf War, For Peace in the Middle East, co-edited with Kettle, St John. Pluto Press, Sydney (1991)
 Speaking with the Sun: New Stories by Australian and New Zealand Writers, co-edited with Parkin, Jane. Allen & Unwin, Sydney (1991).
 Intimacy and Solitude: Balancing Closeness and Independence, William Heinemann Australia, Melbourne; The Women's Press, London (1992); W.W. Norton & Co, New York (1994); revised edition, Random House, Sydney; The Women's Press, London (2002).
 The Intimacy and Solitude: Self-Therapy Book, William Heinemann Australia, Melbourne; The Women's Press, London (1993); published as The Intimacy and Solitude Workbook, W.W. Norton & Co, New York (1994).  
 Forgiveness and Other Acts of Love, Viking Penguin, Melbourne; W.W. Norton & Co, New York; The Women's Press, London (1997)
 Daily Acts of Love, Penguin Books, Melbourne (1999)
 The Universal Heart: A Practical Guide to Love, Viking, Melbourne (2000); Michael Joseph, London (2002).
 Every Day A New Beginning, Penguin, Melbourne (2002)
 Living Words: Journal Writing for Self-Discovery, Insight & Creativity, Viking, Melbourne (2003).
 Free Thinking: On Happiness, Emotional Intelligence, Relationships, Power and Spirit, Allen & Unwin, Sydney (2004)
 Choosing Happiness: Life & Soul Essentials, Allen & Unwin, Sydney (2005); Tarcher/Penguin, New York (2007).
 Creative Journal Writing: The Art and Heart of Reflection, Allen & Unwin, Sydney (2007); Tarcher/Penguin, New York (2009).
 The Almost Perfect Marriage: One-Minute Relationship Skills, Allen & Unwin, Sydney (2007)
 In the Company of Rilke (incl. original translations by Burrows, Mark S.) Allen & Unwin, Sydney (2007); Tarcher/Penguin, New York (2009).
 Seeking the Sacred: Transforming Our View of Ourselves and One Another, Tarcher/Penguin, New York; Allen & Unwin, Sydney (2010).
 Everyday Kindness: Shortcuts to a Happier and More Confident Life, Allen & Unwin, Sydney (2011); Tarcher/Penguin, New York (2012).
 Heaven on Earth: Timeless Prayers of Wisdom and Love, Tarcher/Penguin, New York; Allen & Unwin, Sydney (2013).

Fiction
 Running Backwards Over Sand Viking Penguin, Melbourne, London (1985).
 Tasting Salt Viking Penguin, Melbourne, London (1997).

Children's
 Katherine Rose says no! Random House, Sydney (1995).
 The Moon Shines Out of the Dark Allen & Unwin, Sydney (2012).

References

External links
 
 Universal Health Book Club
 Pitt Street Uniting Church
 
 

Australian writers
Living people
1947 births
People from Wellington City
Victoria University of Wellington alumni
University of Sydney alumni
People educated at Sacred Heart College, Lower Hutt